Melaleuca leiopyxis is a shrub in the myrtle family, Myrtaceae and is endemic to an area near the west coast of Western Australia. It has bright yellow flowers and is very similar to Melaleuca depressa. The ranges of the two species overlap making it difficult to distinguish between them.

Description
Its leaves are arranged alternately, have a thin covering of soft hairs and are narrow oval to elliptical in shape, with a blunt to slightly pointed tip.

The flowers mainly appear during September and October and are bright yellow, turning brown with age. The stamens are arranged in bundles of five around the flower, with 8 to 14 stamens in each bundle.

Taxonomy and naming
Melaleuca leiopyxis was first formally described in 1867 by George Bentham in Flora Australiensis. The specific epithet (leiopyxis) is derived from Greek words meaning "smooth" or "bald", and "box", referring to the smooth fruit.

Distribution and habitat
Melaleuca leiopyxis occurs in the Kalbarri - Shark Bay area in the  Carnarvon, Geraldton Sandplains and Yalgoo biogeographic regions. It grows in red sand on sand dunes and limestone hills.

Conservation status
Melaleuca leiopyxis is listed as "not threatened" by the Government of Western Australia Department of Parks and Wildlife.

Use in horticulture
This melaleuca is rarely cultivated although it has grown successfully in Adelaide. It would probably be an excellent plant to trial in exposed coastal gardens.

References

leiopyxis
Myrtales of Australia
Plants described in 1867
Endemic flora of Western Australia
Taxa named by George Bentham